The Tenth Doctor comic stories is a wide range of adventures featuring the tenth incarnation of the Doctor, the Time Lord protagonist of the popular sci-fi series, Doctor Who. The range had the unprecedented claim of appearing in no less than four regularly published titles: the long established Doctor Who Magazine, the more recently launched Doctor Who Adventures, aimed at a younger audience, the Doctor Who: Battles in Time magazine (a title used to support the sale of an expanding number of collectable trading cards (which accompany the magazine or could be purchased separately)), and Doctor Who, a US monthly title launched in 2009. In 2010, the comic stories passed onto the Eleventh Doctor.

Comics

Doctor Who Magazine

Doctor Who Adventures

Doctor Who: Battles in Time

Doctor Who Storybook

Doctor Who (IDW)

Titan Comics

Summer Events

Doctor Who Annual

Short stories

Doctor Who Annual

Doctor Who Storybook

See also
 List of Doctor Who comic stories
 First Doctor comic stories
 Second Doctor comic stories
 Third Doctor comic stories
 Fourth Doctor comic strips
 Fifth Doctor comic stories
 Sixth Doctor comic stories
 Seventh Doctor comic stories
 Eighth Doctor comic stories
 Ninth Doctor comic stories
 Eleventh Doctor comic stories
 Twelfth Doctor comic stories
 Thirteenth Doctor comic stories
 Dalek comic strips, illustrated annuals and graphic novels

External links
http://www.alteredvistas.co.uk/html/tenth_doctor.html

Comics based on Doctor Who
Tenth Doctor stories